Fire services in Kawartha Lakes, Ontario, Canada are provided by each municipality. There are 20 fire stations across the region.

Operations

Lindsay
Station 1 - Lindsay Fire Hall consists of one fire hall with one rescue vehicle, one 100' aerial truck and one tanker. The station is as follows:

Station 1 - 9 Cambridge St. N.

Omemee
Station 2 - Omemee Fire Hall consists of one fire hall with one pumper, one rescue vehicle and one mini-pumper. The station is also home to a vintage 1949 fire vehicle. The station is as follows:

Bobcaygeon
Station 3 - Bobcaygeon Fire Hall consists of one fire hall with one pumper and one rescue vehicle. The station is as follows:

Station 3 - 1 Duke St.

Ops
Station 4 - Ops Fire Hall consists of one fire hall with one pumper. The station is as follows:

Station 4 - 2571 Highway 7

Dunsford
Station 5 - Dunsford Fire Hall consists of one fire hall with one pumper(511) and one tanker(512). The station is as follows:

Station 5 - 48 Community Center Rd.

Emily
Station 6 - Emily Township Fire Station consists of one fire hall with one pumper and one rescue vehicle. The station is as follows:

Station 6 - Centerline & Pigeon Lake Rd.

Bethany
Station 7 - Bethany Fire Hall consists of one fire hall with one 2017 pumper tanker, and one 1999 pumper. The station is as follows:

Station 7 - 88 Ski Hill Road

Pontypool
Station 8 - Pontypool Fire Hall consists of one fire hall with one tanker, one rescue vehicle and one pumper. The station is as follows:

Station 8 - 6 Bradley St.

Janetville
Station 9 - Janetville Fire Hall consists of one fire hall with one tanker and one pumper. The station is as follows:

Station 9 - 669 Janetville Rd.

Little Britain
Station 10 - Little Britain Fire Hall consists of one fire hall with one pumper-tanker and one pumper-rescue. The station is as follows:

Station 10 - 1050 Little Britain Rd.

Oakwood
Station 11 - Oakwood Fire Hall consists of one fire hall with one tanker, one rescue vehicle and one pumper. The station is as follows:

Station 11 - 972 Eldon Rd.

Cameron
Station 12 - Cameron Fire Hall consists of one fire hall with one tanker and one pumper. The station is as follows:

Station 12 - 16 Cameron Rd.

Woodville
Station 14 - Woodville Fire Hall consists of one fire hall with one tanker, one rescue vehicle and one pumper. The station is as follows:

Station 14 - 114 Argyle St.

Kirkfield
Station 15 - Kirkfield Fire Hall consists of one fire hall with one pumper, one tanker and one rescue vehicle. The station is as follows:

Station 15 - 16 Monroe St.

Carden
Station 16 - Carden Fire Hall consists of one fire hall with one rescue vehicle. The station is as follows:

Station 16 - 12 Lake Dalrymple Rd.

Norland
Station 17 - Norland Fire Hall consists of one fire hall with one tanker, one rescue vehicle and one pumper. The station is as follows:

Station 17 - 7481 Highway 35

Kinmount
Station 18 - Kinmount Fire Hall consists of one fire hall with two pumpers. The station is as follows:

Station 18 - 24 Majestic St.

Coboconk
Station 19 - Coboconk Fire Hall consists of one fire hall with one rescue vehicle, one pumper and one tanker. The station is as follows:

Station 19 - 47 Grandy Rd.

Burnt River
Station 20 - Burnt River Fire Hall consists of one fire hall with one tanker, one pumper, support unit and one off-road vehicle with medical trailer. The station is as follows:

Station 20 - 186 Burnt River Rd.

Fenelon Falls
Station 22 - Fenelon Falls Fire Hall consists of one fire hall with one pumper, one tanker and one hydraulic platform.

Station 22 - 9 John St.

References

External links
 Kawartha Lakes Fire Services

Kawartha Lakes
Fire departments in Ontario